Bennett Peak is a  elevation summit located on Navajo Nation land in San Juan County of northwest New Mexico, United States. It is a landmark set one mile west of U.S. Route 491, along with Ford Butte on the opposite side of the highway. Bennett Peak is set in the northeastern part of the Navajo Volcanic Field, a volcanic field that includes intrusions and flows of minette and other unusual igneous rocks which formed around 30 million years ago during the Oligocene. Bennett Peak lies within the Chaco River drainage basin.

History
US Army Lt. James H. Simpson of the United States Corps of Topographical Engineers passed here on August 30, 1849, and recorded in his journal about these splendid peaks. Bennett Peak was later named after Major Frank Tracy Bennett (1840–1894), 9th Cavalry, who served as agent to the Navajos from 1869 to 1871 and 1880–81. This geographical feature's name was officially adopted in 1915 by the U.S. Board on Geographic Names. The Navajo name for this peak, Tsézhin ‘Ií’áhí, means "Trap rocks sticking up". The first ascent of this peak was made in 1992 by Cameron Burns and Luke Laeser. Scenes from the 2014 movie "Beyond the Reach" were filmed at Bennett Peak.

Gallery

Climate 
According to the Köppen climate classification system, Bennett Peak is located in a semi-arid climate zone with cold winters and hot summers. Climate data for Shiprock, New Mexico, 30 miles to the north.

See also
 Rock formations in the United States
 Volcanic plug

References

External links
 Weather forecast: National Weather Service
 Bennett Peak rock climbing: Mountainproject.com

Rock formations of New Mexico
Landmarks in New Mexico
Volcanic plugs of the United States
Diatremes of New Mexico
Landforms of San Juan County, New Mexico
Geography of the Navajo Nation
Oligocene volcanism